Déron Payne (born 25 September 2002) is a Dutch football player. He plays as a right-back for Eredivisie club Volendam.

Club career
On 18 May 2022, Payne signed a three-year contract with Volendam and was initially assigned to their Under-21 squad.

He made his Eredivisie debut for Volendam on 6 November 2022 in a game against Feyenoord.

References

External links
 

2002 births
People from Haarlemmermeer
Footballers from North Holland
Living people
Dutch footballers
Association football defenders
Koninklijke HFC players
FC Volendam players
Tweede Divisie players
Eredivisie players